Tritoniella gnocchi is a species of the nudibranch genus Tritoniella.

Distribution
It is the only Tritoniella species that was found north of the Polar front outside of the Southern Ocean.

Ecology
Its diet consists of the gorgonian soft coral belonging to the family Primnoidae.

Etymology 
The species name was dedicated to the Italian dumpling gnocchi due to the similarity to its external body form.

References 

Gastropods described in 2022
Tritoniidae